Khariton Prokofievich Laptev (1700–1763) was a Russian naval officer and Arctic explorer.

Khariton Laptev was born in a gentry family in the village of Pokarevo near Velikiye Luki (in the southern part of today's Pskov Oblast), just a year before his cousin Dmitry Laptev was born in the nearby village of Bolotovo.

Khariton Laptev started his career in the Russian Navy as a cadet in 1718. By 1730, he was already in charge of a military ship, and in 1734 participated in the siege of Gdańsk.

In 1739–1742, Khariton Laptev led one of the parties of the Second Kamchatka expedition. Together with Semion Chelyuskin, N. Chekin, and G. Medvedev, Laptev described the Taimyr Peninsula from the mouth of the Khatanga River to the mouth of the Pyasina river and discovered a few of the islands in the area. After the expedition, he participated in the creation of the "General Map of the Siberian and Kamchatka Coast", and continued his military service in the Baltic Fleet. The sea coastline of the Taimyr Peninsula, a cape on the Chelyuskin Peninsula and other landmarks bear his name. The Laptev Sea was also named after him (and his cousin Dmitry Laptev).

References 
 Двоюродные братья Дмитрий Яковлевич и Харитон Прокофьевич Лаптевы (The cousins Dmitry Yakovlevich and Khariton Prokofyevich Laptev) 

1700 births
1763 deaths
Explorers of the Arctic
Russian and Soviet polar explorers
Explorers from the Russian Empire
Laptev Sea
18th-century people from the Russian Empire
18th-century explorers
History of the Kamchatka Peninsula
Imperial Russian Navy personnel
Great Northern Expedition